Francis Lauder (d 13 February 1724) was an eighteenth century Irish Anglican priest: in 1721 he became Precentor of Ardfert; and later that year Archdeacon of Ardfert from 1724 until 1738.

References

18th-century Irish Anglican priests
Archdeacons of Ardfert
Diocese of Limerick, Ardfert and Aghadoe
1724 deaths